Josly Piette (born 1943 in Glons) is a Belgian politician and former trade unionist. He is a member of the Centre démocrate humaniste (cdH). 

Since 2006 he has been mayor of the Liège municipality of Bassenge.  He was also Federal Minister of Employment in the interim Verhofstadt III government from 2007 till 2008.

References

External links 
 Josly Piette in ODIS - Online Database for Intermediary Structures 

1943 births
Living people
Belgian trade unionists
Centre démocrate humaniste politicians
Government ministers of Belgium
Mayors of places in Belgium
People from Bassenge
21st-century Belgian politicians